Alojz is a given name. Notable people with the name include:

Alojz Ajdič (born 1939), Slovenian composer, author of many orchestral works
Alojz Fandel, former Slovak football player and coach
Alojz Geržinič (1915–2008), Slovenian composer
Alojz Gradnik (1882–1967), Slovene poet and translator
Alojz Ipavec, also written as Lojze Ipavic (1815–1849), Slovenian composer
Alojz Knafelc, Slovenian mountaineer and the inventor of the Slovenian trail blaze
Alojz Rebula (born 1924), Slovene writer, playwright, essayist and translator
Alojz Rigele (1879–1940), sculptor from Bratislava
Alojz Tkáč (born 1934), the first archbishop of the Košice Episcopal see (1995–2010)
Alojz Uran or Alojzij Uran (born 1945), Slovenian prelate of the Roman Catholic Church

Slovene masculine given names
Slovak masculine given names

de:Alojz